Mario Lessona (18 December 1855 in Genoa – 25 December 1911 in Turin) was an Italian zoologist and malacologist. He was the son of the prominent natural scientist and senator Michele Lessona and his wife Adele Masi Lessona, who was very much involved in her husband's work, particularly in making translations. A son of Adele Lessona by an earlier marriage was the painter and malacologist Carlo Pollonera, with whom Mario published a monograph on Italian slugs. Mario also coauthored various scientific works with his brother-in-law, the zoologist and senator Lorenzo Camerano.

Biography
In the 1880s, Lessona was an assistant professor of zoology at the University of Messina, and then a teacher of natural history at secondary schools in Venice and Carmagnola. In the 1890s he worked as a teacher in the Fornaris-Morocco boarding school in Turin. He published on malacology and comparative anatomy, as well as writing several books of natural history and geography for schools. He also edited and translated further scientific works.

Taxa
Taxa named by Lessona include:
 Ariunculus Lessona, 1881
 Tandonia Lessona & Pollonera, 1882
 Ariunculus isselii Lessona & Pollonera, 1882
 Ariunculus speziae Lessona, 1881
 Deroceras panormitanum (Lessona & Pollonera, 1882)
 Falkneria camerani (Lessona, 1880)
 Lehmannia melitensis (Lessona & Pollonera, 1882)
 Lehmannia rupicola Lessona & Pollonera, 1882
 Limax subalpinus Lessona, 1880
 Limax veronensis Lessona & Pollonera, 1882
 Phenacolimax stabilei (Lessona, 1880)

References

External links 
 Discussion in Italian internet forum
 Catalogo del Servizio Bibliotecario Nazionale (enter "Lessona, Mario" in search box for list of publications)

1855 births
1911 deaths
Italian zoologists
Academic staff of the University of Messina
Scientists from Genoa